Winifred Mitchell Baker (born 1957) is the Executive Chairwoman and CEO of the Mozilla Foundation and of Mozilla Corporation, a subsidiary of the Mozilla Foundation that coordinates development of the open source Mozilla Internet applications, including the Mozilla Firefox web browser.

Baker was trained as a lawyer. She coordinates business and policy issues and sits on both the Mozilla Foundation Board of Directors and the Mozilla Corporation Board of Directors. In 2005, Time included her in its annual list of the 100 most influential people in the world.

Education and early employment
Baker received a BA in Chinese studies at  the University of California, Berkeley in 1979, achieving a Certificate of Distinction. She received her JD from the Boalt Hall School of Law, University of California, Berkeley in 1987 and was admitted to the State Bar of California in the same year. From January 1990 until October 1993, she worked as a Corporate and Intellectual Property Associate at Fenwick & West LLP, a law practice that specialises in providing legal services to high technology companies. She then worked for Sun Microsystems as an Associate General Counsel from November 1993 until October 1994.

Netscape Communications Corporation and mozilla.org
In November 1994, Baker was hired as one of the first employees of the legal department of Netscape Communications Corporation. Reporting directly to CEO Jim Barksdale, she jointly set up the initial department. She was responsible for intellectual property protection and legal issues relating to product development, reporting to the General Counsel. She also created and managed the Technology Group of the Legal Department. She was involved with the Mozilla project from the outset, writing both the Netscape Public License and the Mozilla Public License. In February 1999, Baker became the general manager of mozilla.org, the division of Netscape that coordinated the Mozilla open source project. In 2001, she was fired during a round of layoffs at America Online, by then the parent of Netscape. Despite this, she continued to serve as general manager of mozilla.org on a volunteer basis.

Open Source Applications Foundation
In November 2002, Baker was employed by the Open Source Applications Foundation, helping to guide the group's community relations and taking a seat on OSAF's Board of Directors.

Mozilla Foundation and Mozilla Corporation

Baker was instrumental in the creation of the Mozilla Foundation, an independent non-profit that was launched on July 15, 2003, as America Online shut down the Netscape browser division and drastically scaled back its involvement with the Mozilla project. Baker became the President of the Mozilla Foundation and was appointed to the five-person Board of Directors.

When the Mozilla Corporation was launched as a taxable subsidiary of the Mozilla Foundation on August 3, 2005, Baker was named the CEO of the new entity. In addition, she joined the Mozilla Corporation's Board of Directors, though she also kept her seat on the Mozilla Foundation's board, as well as her role as Chairperson.

On January 8, 2008, Mozilla announced that Baker, while retaining her role as Chairperson of the Mozilla Foundation, would no longer serve as CEO of the Corporation, and that MoCo's Chief Operating Officer John Lilly would take over this role. The reasons cited for this change was Mozilla's rapid growth, which made it difficult for executives to continue to take on many different roles. In April 2020 she was named CEO of Mozilla Corporation again.

Negative salary-achievements correlation controversy 

In 2018 she received a total of $2,458,350 in compensation from Mozilla, which represents a 400% payrise since 2008. On the same period, Firefox marketshare was down 85%. When asked about her salary she stated "I learned that my pay was about an 80% discount to market. Meaning that competitive roles elsewhere were paying about 5 times as much. That's too big a discount to ask people and their families to commit to."

In 2020, after returning to the position of CEO, her salary had risen to over $3 million. In the same year the Mozilla Corporation laid off approximately 250 employees due to shrinking revenues. Baker blamed this on the COVID-19 pandemic.

Awards and recognition
Mitchell Baker was listed among the 2005 Top 100 by Time, in the "Scientists & Thinkers" section.

In 2009, Baker received the Anita Borg Institute Women of Vision Award for Leadership.

In 2012, Baker was inducted into the Internet Hall of Fame by the Internet Society.

Personal life
Baker's husband is Casey Dunn. She has one son.

References

External links

 Firefox, Community and Lizard Wrangling, Mitchell Baker speaks at Stanford University
 Mitchell Baker's weblog
 About the Mozilla Foundation (includes information about Baker's role at the Mozilla Foundation)
 OSAF Mitchell Baker biography
 BBC Profile of Mitchell Baker for series Valley Girls

Netscape people
Living people
1957 births
Businesspeople from Oakland, California
Mozilla people
Lawyers from Oakland, California
American chairpersons of corporations
American technology chief executives
American women chief executives
Women Internet pioneers
UC Berkeley School of Law alumni
UC Berkeley College of Letters and Science alumni
20th-century American businesswomen
20th-century American businesspeople
21st-century American businesswomen
21st-century American businesspeople
20th-century American lawyers